Twelve ships of the Royal Navy have borne the name HMS Mosquito, or the archaic HMS Musquito, after the tropical insect, the Mosquito:

  was a vessel in service in 1777.
  was a 6-gun schooner, previously the French privateer Venus.  She was captured in 1793, purchased by the Navy in 1794, and paid off in 1796.
 HMS Musquito was the name vessel for the two-vessel Musquito class of floating batteries; she was launched in 1794 but wrecked in June 1795.
  was a 16-gun ship-sloop, previously the French privateer Petite Magicienne. She was captured by three Spanish frigates in September 1798. 
  or Muskito was a 12-gun schooner captured from the French in 1799 and sold in 1802.
  was a  launched in 1804 and sold in 1822.
  was a  launched in 1825 and sold in 1843.
  was a 16-gun  launched in 1851 and sold to the Prussian Navy in 1862.
  was a composite  launched in 1871 and sold in 1888.
  was a paddle river gunboat launched in 1890 and sold in 1902.
  was a  launched in 1910 and sold in 1920.
  was a  launched in 1939 and sunk in 1940.
  was a naval base in Alexandria, Egypt during World War II

See also
  was a torpedo boat launched in 1884. She served in the Queensland Maritime Defence Force and (after federation) the Commonwealth Naval Forces and was sold in 1912.

References
 
  
 

Royal Navy ship names